Gush Laghar (also Romanized as Gūsh Lāghar; also known as Qūsh) is a village in Salehabad Rural District, Salehabad County, Razavi Khorasan Province, Iran. At the 2006 census, its population was 1,376, in 313 families.

References 

Populated places in   Torbat-e Jam County